Abdolabad-e Gardaneh (also Romanized as ‘Abdolābād-e Gardaneh; also known as ‘Abdolābād) is a village in Kahrizak Rural District, Kahrizak District, Ray County, Tehran Province, Iran. At the 2006 census, its population was 661, in 166 families.

References 

Populated places in Ray County, Iran